Rhabdochaeta is a genus of tephritid or fruit flies in the family Tephritidae.

Species
Rhabdochaeta advena Hering, 1942
Rhabdochaeta affinis Zia, 1939
Rhabdochaeta ampla Hardy, 1973
Rhabdochaeta asteria Hendel, 1915
Rhabdochaeta crockeri Curran, 1936
Rhabdochaeta formosana Shiraki, 1933
Rhabdochaeta gladifera Hering, 1941
Rhabdochaeta guamae Malloch, 1942
Rhabdochaeta lutescens (Bezzi, 1924)
Rhabdochaeta multilineata Hering, 1941
Rhabdochaeta naevia Ito, 1984
Rhabdochaeta neavei Bezzi, 1920
Rhabdochaeta nigra Bezzi, 1924
Rhabdochaeta obsoleta Bezzi, 1924
Rhabdochaeta pluscula Hardy, 1970
Rhabdochaeta pulchella Meijere, 1904
Rhabdochaeta queenslandica Hardy & Drew, 1996
Rhabdochaeta spinosa Lamb, 1914
Rhabdochaeta subspinosa Bezzi, 1924
Rhabdochaeta wedelia Hardy & Drew, 1996

References

Tephritinae
Tephritidae genera
Diptera of Asia
Diptera of Africa
Diptera of Australasia